Foar is a town in the northeastern Bari region of Somalia, on the coast of the Guardafui Channel. It is a center for the local lobster market.

Notes

References
Foar, Somalia

Populated places in Bari, Somalia